Tal is a given name and a surname of Hebrew origin meaning "dew". It is a popular name in Israel for boys and girls.

Given name

Men
 Tal Aizik (born 1993), Israeli professional Dota 2 video game player
 Tal Bachman (born 1968), Canadian singer
 Tal Ben Haim (born 1982), Israeli footballer
 Tal Ben Haim (footballer, born 1989), Israeli footballer
 Tal Brody (born 1943), Israeli-American Euroleague basketball player
 Tal Dunne (born 1987), Welsh-born Israeli professional basketball player for Israeli team Ironi Nes Ziona
 Tal Erel (born 1996), Israel National Baseball Team player
 Tal Flicker (born 1992), Israeli judoka
 Tal Friedman (born 1963), Israeli actor and comedian
 Tal Kachila (born 1992), Israeli footballer
 Tal Karpelesz (born 1990), Israeli-Romanian basketball
 Tal Rousso (born 1959), retired Israel Defense Forces general
 Tal Shaked (born 1978), American chess grandmaster
 Tal Stricker (born 1979), Israeli Olympic swimmer

Women
 Tal (singer), full name Tal Benyerzi (born 1989), Israeli-born French singer
 Tal Karp (born 1981), female Australian football (soccer) player
 Tal Rabin (born 1962), Israeli computer scientist
 Tal Wilkenfeld (born 1986), Australian bassist

Surname
 Alon Tal (born 1960), Israeli politician
 Alona Tal (born 1983), Israeli-American actress
 David Tal (historian), expert on Israel's security and diplomatic history and U.S. disarmament policy
 David Tal (Israeli politician) (born 1950), four-time member of the Knesset and member of the Kadima party
 Erez Tal (born 1961), Israeli announcer and TV presenter
 Idan Tal (born 1975), Israeli football manager and former player
 Israel Tal (1924–2010), Israeli general, known for the development of the Merkava tank
 Joseph Tal (1910–2008), Israeli composer
Marjo Tal (1915-2006), Dutch composer
 Mikhail Tal (1936–1992), Soviet world chess champion
 Nickol Tal (born 1994), Israeli fencer
 Tobias Tal (1847–1898), Dutch rabbi
 Yael Tal (born 1983), Israeli actress

Hebrew unisex given names